In mathematics, calculus on Euclidean space is a generalization of calculus of functions in one or several variables to calculus of functions on Euclidean space  as well as a finite-dimensional real vector space. This calculus is also known as advanced calculus, especially in the United States. It is similar to multivariable calculus but is somehow more sophisticated in that it uses linear algebra (or some functional analysis) more extensively and covers some concepts from differential geometry such as differential forms and Stokes' formula in terms of differential forms. This extensive use of linear algebra also allows a natural generalization of multivariable calculus to calculus on Banach spaces or topological vector spaces.

Calculus on Euclidean space is also a local model of calculus on manifolds, a theory of functions on manifolds.

Basic notions

Functions in one real variable 
This section is a brief review of function theory in one-variable calculus.

A real-valued function  is continuous at  if it is approximately constant near ; i.e.,

In contrast, the function  is differentiable at  if it is approximately linear near ; i.e., there is some real number  such that

(For simplicity, suppose . Then the above means that  where  goes to 0 faster than h going to 0 and, in that sense,  behaves like .)

More generally,  is called a Ck function if its derivative  is Ck-1 function. Taylor's theorem states that a Ck function is precisely a function that can be approximated by a polynomial of degree k.

In particular,  is bijective for some open interval  containing . The inverse function theorem then says that the inverse function  is differentiable on U with the derivatives: for

Derivative of a map and chain rule 
For functions  defined in the plane or more generally on an Euclidean space , it is necessary to consider functions that are vector-valued or matrix-valued. It is also conceptually helpful to do this in an invariant manner (i.e., a coordinate-free way). Derivatives of such maps at a point are then vectors or linear maps, not real numbers.

As in the one-variable case, there is

This is proved exactly as for functions in one variable. Indeed, with the notation , we have:

As for the first term, it can be written as:

The map  as above is called continuously differentiable or  if it is differentiable on the domain and also the derivatives vary continuously; i.e.,  is continuous.

which is the form of the chain rule that is often stated.

A partial converse to the above holds. Namely, if the partial derivatives  are all defined and continuous, then  is continuously differentiable. This is a consequence of the mean value inequality:

(This version of mean value inequality follows from mean value inequality in  applied to the function , where the proof on mean value inequality is given.)

Indeed, let . We note that, if , then

For simplicity, assume  (the argument for the general case is similar). Then, by mean value inequality, with the operator norm ,

which implies  as required. 

Example: Let  be the set of all invertible real square matrices of size n.
.
Taking , we get:
.
Now, we then have:

Higher derivatives and Taylor formula
If  is differentiable where  is an open subset, then the derivatives determine the map , where  stands for homomorphisms between vector spaces; i.e., linear maps. If  is differentiable, then . Here, the codomain of  can be identified with the space of bilinear maps by:

Moreover, if  exists and is continuous, then the matrix  is symmetric, the fact known as the symmetry of second derivatives. This is seen using the mean value inequality.

which says

As in the case of one variable, the Taylor series expansion can then be proved by integration by parts: 

Taylor's formula has an effect of dividing a function by variables, which can be illustrated by the next typical theoretical use of the formula.

(The space  is called a Schwartz space.)

Now, assume  commutes with coordinates; i.e., . Then
.
Now, assume further that  commutes with partial differentiations. We then easily see that  is a constant;  is a multiplication by a constant.

(Aside: the above discussion almost proves the Fourier inversion formula. Indeed, let  be the Fourier transform and the reflection; i.e., . Then, dealing directly with the integral that is involved, one can see  commutes with coordinates and partial differentiations; hence,  is a multiplication by a constant. This is almost a proof since one still has to compute this constant.)

A partial converse to the Taylor formula also holds; see Borel's lemma and Whitney extension theorem.

Inverse function theorem and submersion theorem 

A -map with the -inverse is called a -diffeomorphism. Thus, the theorem says that, for a map  satisfying the hypothesis at a point ,  is a diffeomorphism near  For a proof, see .

The theorem follows from the inverse function theorem; see .

Another consequence is the submersion theorem.

Integrable functions on Euclidean spaces 
A partition of an interval  is a finite sequence .

where

A key theorem is

The next theorem allows us to compute the integral of a function as the iteration of the integrals of the function in one-variables:

In particular, the order of integrations can be changed.

Surface integral 

If  is vector-valued, then we define

Since , we have:

Vector analysis

Tangent vectors and vector fields 
Let  be a differentiable curve.
.

For example, if  is a helix, then the tangent vector at t is:

It corresponds to the intuition that the a point on the helix moves up in a constant speed.

A vector field X is an assignment to each point p in M a tangent vector  to M at p such that the assignment varies smoothly.

Differential forms 
The dual notion of a vector field is a differential form.

Then every differential 1-form  can be written uniquely as

More generally, a differential k-form is an assignment to a point  in  a vector  in the -th exterior power  of the dual space  of  such that the assignment varies smoothly. In particular, a 0-form is the same as a smooth function. Also, any -form  can be written uniquely as:

for some smooth functions .

Like a smooth function, we can differentiate and integrate differential forms. If  is a smooth function, then  can be written as:

Note that, in the above expression, the left-hand side (whence the right-hand side) is independent of coordinates ; this property is called the invariance of differential.

The operation  is called the exterior derivative and it extends to any differential forms inductively by the requirement (Leibniz rule)

where  are a p-form and a q-form.

The exterior derivative has the important property that ; that is, the exterior derivative  of a differential form  is zero. This property is a consequence of the symmetry of second derivatives (mixed partials are equal).

Boundary and orientation 

A circle can be oriented clockwise or counterclockwise. For example, a circle or, more generally, an n-sphere can be oriented; i.e., orientable. On the other hand, a Möbius strip (a surface obtained by identified by two opposite sides of the rectangle in a twisted way) cannot oriented: if we start with a normal vector and travel around the strip, the normal vector at end will point to the opposite direction.

The proposition is useful because it allows us to give an orientation by giving a volume form.

Integration of differential forms 

If M is given the orientation opposite to the standard one, then  is defined as the negative of the right-hand side.

Then we have the fundamental formula relating exterior derivative and integration:

Here is a sketch of proof of the formula.

(since, by the fundamental theorem of calculus, the above can be evaluated on boundaries of the set containing the support.) On the other hand,

The formula generalizes the fundamental theorem of calculus as well as Stokes' theorem in multivariable calculus.
.
Collecting the terms, we thus get:

Hence, Stokes’ formula becomes

which is the usual form of the Stokes' theorem on surfaces. Green’s theorem is also a special case of Stokes’ formula.

Stokes' formula also yields a general version of Cauchy's integral formula. To state and prove it, for the complex variable  and the conjugate , let us introduce the operators

In these notations, a function  is holomorphic (complex-analytic) if and only if  (the Cauchy–Riemann equations).
Also, we have:

Let  be a punctured disk with center .
.

By Stokes’ formula,

Letting  we then get:

Winding numbers and Poincaré lemma 

A differential form  is called closed if  and is called exact if  for some differential form  (often called a potential). Since , an exact form is closed. But the converse does not hold in general; there might be a non-exact closed form. A classic example of such a form is:
,
Suppose we switch to polar coordinates:  where . Then

The calculation, however, shows that  is exact, for example, on  since we can take  there.

There is a result (Poincaré lemma) that gives a condition that guarantees closed forms are exact. To state it, we need some notions from topology. Intuitively, a homotopy is a continuous variation of one function to another. A loop in a set  is a curve whose starting point coincides with the end point; i.e.,  such that . A typical example of a simply connected set is a disk . A punctured disk, on the other hand, is not simply connected.

Geometry of curves and surfaces

Moving frame 
Another example is the cylindrical frame

For the study of the geometry of a curve, the important frame to use is a Frenet frame  on a unit-speed curve  given as:

The Gauss–Bonnet theorem 
The Gauss–Bonnet theorem relates the topology of a surface and its geometry.

Calculus of variations

Method of Lagrange multiplier 

The set  is usually called a constraint.

Example: Suppose we want to find the minimum distance between the circle  and the line . That means that we want to minimize the function , the square distance between a point  on the circle and a point  on the line, under the constraint . We have:

If , then , not possible. Thus,  and

Here is an application to linear algebra. Let  be a finite-dimensional real vector space and  a self-adjoint operator. Consider the function , where the bracket means the inner product. Then . Since , by Lagrange multiplier, we find a real number  such that  But that means . Hence, we are done. .

Weak derivatives 
Up to measure-zero sets, two functions can be determined to be equal or not by means of integration against other functions (called test functions). Namely, the following sometimes called the fundamental lemma of calculus of variations:

Given a continuous function , by the lemma, a continuously differentiable function  is such that  if and only if

for every .

where there is no boundary term since  has compact support. Now the key point is that this expression makes sense even if  is not necessarily differentiable and thus can be used to give sense to a derivative of such a function.

A usual derivative is often then called a classical derivative.

A classic example of a weak derivative is that of the Heaviside function , the characteristic function on the interval . For every test function , we have:

Let  denote the linear functional , called the Dirac delta function (although not exactly a function). Then the above can be written as:

Cauchy's integral formula has a similar interpretation in terms of weak derivatives. For the complex variable , let .

Since , this means:

or
 
In general, a generalized function is called a fundamental solution for a linear partial differential operator if the application of the operator to it is the Dirac delta. Hence, the above says  is the fundamental solution for the differential operator .

Hamilton–Jacobi theory

Calculus on manifolds

Definition of a manifold 
This section requires some background in general topology.

A manifold is a Hausdorff topological space that is locally modeled by an Euclidean space. By definition, an atlas of a topological space  is a set of maps , called charts, such that
 is a homeomorphism and
 is smooth; thus a diffeomorphism.
By definition, a manifold is a second-countable Hausdorff topological space with a maximal atlas (called a differentiable structure); "maximal" means that it is not contained in strictly larger atlas. The dimension of the manifold  is the dimension of the model Euclidean space ; namely,  and a manifold is called an n-manifold when it has dimension n.

A manifold is paracompact; this has an implication that it admits a partition of unity subordinate to a given open cover.

If  is replaced by an upper half-space , then we get the notion of a manifold-with-boundary.

The next theorem furnishes many examples of manifolds.

Hence, the n-sphere  is an n-manifold.

The theorem is proved as a corollary of the inverse function theorem.

The next theoretically important result says that there is no other kind of manifolds. An immersion is a smooth map whose differential is injective. An embedding is an immersion that is homeomorphic (thus diffeomorphic) to the image.

The proof that a manifold can be embedded into  for some N is considerably easier and can be readily given here. It is known  that a manifold has a finite atlas . Let  be smooth functions such that  and  cover  (e.g., a partition of unity). Consider the map

It is easy to see that  is an injective immersion. It may not be an embedding. To fix that, we shall use:

where  is a smooth proper map. The existence of a smooth proper map is a consequence of a partition of unity. See  for the rest of the proof in the case of an immersion. 

Nash's embedding theorem says that, if  is equipped with a Riemannian metric, then the embedding can be taken to be isometric with an  expense of increasing ; for this, see this T. Tao's blog.

Tubular neighborhood and transversality 

A technically important result is:

This can be proved by putting a Riemannian metric on the manifold . The exponential map here may not be injective but it is possible to make it injective (thus diffeomorphic) by shrinking  (for now, see see ).

Integration on manifolds and distribution densities 

The starting point for the topic of integration on manifolds is that there is no invariant way to integrate functions on manifolds. This may be obvious if we asked: what is an integration of functions on a finite-dimensional real vector space? (In contrast, there is an invariant way to do differentiation since, by definition, a manifold comes with a differentiable structure). There are several ways to introduce integration theory to manifolds:
Integrate differential forms.
Do integration against some measure.
Equip a manifold with a Riemannian metric and do integration against such a metric.

For example, if a manifold is embedded into an Euclidean space , then it acquires the Lebesgue measure restricting from the ambient Euclidean space and then the second approach works. The first approach is fine in many situations but it requires the manifold to be oriented (and there is a non-orientable manifold that is not pathological). The third approach generalizes and that gives rise to the notion of a density.

Generalizations

Extensions to infinite-dimensional normed spaces 

The notions like differentiability extend to normed spaces.

See also 
 Differential geometry of surfaces
 Integration along fibers
 Lusin's theorem
 Density on a manifold

Notes

Citations

References 

 (revised 1990, Jones and Bartlett; reprinted 2014, World Scientific) [this text in particular discusses density]

 

Calculus